Shaikh Moosa is a town and union council of Tando Allahyar District in the Sindh Province of Pakistan. It is part of Tando Allahyar Taluka and is located in the centre of the district, the Union Council has a population of 65,776.

See also
 Ramapir Temple Tando Allahyar

References

Union councils of Sindh
Populated places in Sindh